Madison Public Library may refer to:
Madison Public Library (Madison, Maine), listed on the National Register of Historic Places (NRHP) in Somerset County, Maine
Madison Public Library (Madison, Nebraska), public library in Madison, Nebraska
Madison Public Library (Madison, Wisconsin), public library system in Madison, Wisconsin
Madison Carnegie Library, Madison, Minnesota, NRHP-listed
Madison Public Library and the James Building, Madison, New Jersey, NRHP-listed